Walls in the City is a soundtrack album by The Denison/Kimball Trio, released on October 3, 1994 by Skin Graft Records. It contains music from the short film of the same name, directed by independent filmmaker Jim Sikora. Most of the score was made up of pre-recorded material that Denison would match to a particular scene. The rest was recorded while the duo played while watching the film.

Track listing

Personnel 
Adapted from Walls in the City liner notes.

The Denison/Kimball Trio
 Duane Denison – electric guitar
 Jim Kimball – drums, brushes, bongos

Production and additional personnel
 The Denison/Kimball Trio – production
 Dan Grzeca – illustrations
 Casey Rice – recording
 Jim Sikora – production

Release history

References

External links 
 

1994 soundtrack albums
The Denison/Kimball Trio albums
Film soundtracks
Skin Graft Records albums
Instrumental albums